Ladies and Gentlemen We Are Floating in Space is the third studio album by English space rock band Spiritualized, released on 16 June 1997. The album features guest appearances from the Balanescu Quartet, The London Community Gospel Choir and Dr. John.

Background
The album's title is from the philosophical novel Sophie's World by Jostein Gaarder, the context being:

The album itself was recorded shortly after the break-up of Spiritualized's Jason Pierce and Kate Radley, the band's keyboard player. Radley had secretly married Richard Ashcroft of The Verve in 1995. Pierce, however, maintains that much of the album, including "Broken Heart" and "Cool Waves", had been written before the breakup. "If you write a song like [Broken Heart], you have to make it feel like what it's like to have a broken heart," he said. "That's what making albums is all about. Otherwise it's just field recordings."

Original pressings had a version of the title track that incorporated the lyrics and melody of Elvis Presley's "Can't Help Falling in Love." The Presley estate initially objected to this, and a remixed version appeared on the commercial release, with new lyrics. However, Spiritualized continue to use both sets of lyrics in live performances. By 2009, they were allowed to use the version with the Presley lyrics on the reissued edition of the album, with the proviso that the song be titled "Ladies and Gentlemen We Are Floating in Space (I Can't Help Falling in Love)."

Album closer "Cop Shoot Cop..." is named after the New York industrial rock band Cop Shoot Cop, and it references lyrics from John Prine's "Sam Stone", incorporating variations on a key line from that song's chorus.

Recording
In the summer of 1995 Jason Pierce and Sean Cook entered Moles Studio in Bath, to start work on demo recordings with resident engineer Trevor Curwen. Pierce would develop his ideas into complete songs during this period.

A few weeks later, recording of the album proper began in earnest, with all of the band members present. Working on 24 track tape synchronised to an Atari sequencer allowed Pierce to build up sequenced tracks from samples of live playing, coupled with some parts gleaned from the demo sessions. The full band line-up, including John Coxon on guitar, performed live over this sequenced backbone.

With the basic framework intact, Pierce moved the project to London to work with producer/engineer Darren Allison (My Bloody Valentine) on the recording of vocals, guitars, keyboards, gospel choir and brass section at The Church Studios. The pair worked on further vocal recording at Rooster Studios, before moving on to recording Strings with the Balanescu Quartet at London's legendary Olympic Studios. At this point, Pierce made a trip to the United States to record Dr. John's piano and vocal parts on the track "Cop Shoot Cop".

The mixing process involved various studios and personnel. Beginning at House of Blues in Memphis, Pierce returned to work again with Darren Allison at The Strongroom Studios, John Leckie, and Trevor Curwen at Moles Studio. With the mixing phase complete, Pierce concentrated on post-production and editing with Mads Bjerke, and Ray Staff at Whitfield Street Studios took charge of the mastering process.

Music
The album's sound is described as space rock, neo-psychedelia, shoegaze, and gospel.

Releases
The artwork was designed by Pierce in collaboration with Mark Farrow. A special edition of the album was packaged in a box designed to resemble prescription medicine, complete with a booklet containing "dosage advice" and a foil blister pack containing the CD. A limited edition was also released, featuring each of the 12 songs in its own individually wrapped 3-inch CD, inside a large blister pack and box.

In 2020, record club Vinyl Me, Please announced they would reissue the album on blue colored vinyl in September of the same year. This will be the first "artist-approved" vinyl reissue of the album.

Critical reception

Ladies and Gentlemen We Are Floating in Space was released to widespread acclaim from music critics. NME critic Paul Moody hailed the album as a "seismic tour de force" and credited Jason Pierce for taking cues from his vast array of musical influences to create an "entirely new noise out of the wreckage", while Melody Maker praised it as "one mind-blowing perspective-fusing supernova of an album... that redefines notions of bittersweet and love-hate to the point where everyday emotions seem very small indeed." Roy Wilkinson of Select noted the album's more elaborate instrumentation and production styles compared to Spiritualized's previous work and called Ladies and Gentlemen We Are Floating in Space a "remarkable testimony to Pierce's vision". Steve Hochman of the Los Angeles Times named the album as "one of the most ambitious and striking sonic pastiches" of the year and said that it "recycles, refines and expands on the key elements" of Lazer Guided Melodies and Pure Phase.

The Austin Chronicles Taylor Holland wrote that Ladies and Gentlemen We Are Floating in Space "adds sunshine to an otherwise dreary summer season for shoegazers" and establishes Spiritualized as "king among loud-minded 'space rock' bands." Rob Brunner of Entertainment Weekly described it as "beautifully weightless and way out" and felt that while the band's "zero-gravity guitar drone" can get monotonous, the album's wide array of instrumentation "keep[s] the songs from drifting away altogether." Robert Christgau of The Village Voice called the album "refreshingly short on the fatalism pawned off as wisdom by the Verve and depressive if impressive Radiohead", later awarding the album a one-star honorable mention rating, indicating "a worthy effort consumers attuned to its overriding aesthetic or individual vision may well like".

Ladies and Gentlemen We Are Floating in Space reached number four on the UK charts, during the height of the Britpop period. The album went on to be named the NME album of the year at the end of 1997, beating other critically acclaimed albums such as Radiohead's OK Computer and The Verve's Urban Hymns. Select and Vox named Ladies and Gentlemen the second best album of the year, while Melody Maker and The Face named it the fifth best. The album ranked at number 13 on Uncuts year-end list, and Q named it as one of the year's 50 best albums. Ladies and Gentlemen We Are Floating in Space also ranked at number 17 on The Village Voices year-end Pazz & Jop critics' poll.

Legacy
Ladies and Gentlemen We Are Floating in Space has since been acclaimed as one of the best albums of the 1990s on various publications' decade-end lists. Pitchfork ranked it at number 55 on their list of the top 100 albums of the 1990s. In 2010, the album was also named one of the 125 Best Albums of the Past 25 Years by Spin. As of March 2010, the album has sold over 111,000 copies in United States.

A majority of the songs on the album were recorded live for the band's following release Royal Albert Hall October 10, 1997. Three singles were released from the album: "Electricity" in July 1997, "I Think I'm in Love" in January 1998, and "Come Together" in July 1998. Spiritualized re-recorded the songs "Come Together" and "Broken Heart" (the former with a cleaner radio mix and the latter with an Ennio Morricone-styled string and horn section) at Abbey Road Studios in early 1998; these tracks comprised the band's Abbey Road EP released in August 1998. The title track of the album appeared in the 2001 Cameron Crowe film Vanilla Sky.

In October and December 2009, Spiritualized performed Ladies and Gentlemen We Are Floating in Space live in its entirety as part of the All Tomorrow's Parties-curated Don't Look Back concert series. To coincide with the shows, a remastered legacy edition of the album with new artwork was released on 30 November 2009 in three formats: a one-disc release of the original album, a three-disc release featuring the original album and two bonus discs containing demos, instrumental versions, and session mixes of the album's songs, and a special collector's edition release limited to 1,000 copies consisting of twelve 3" mini CDs, each containing one of the original album's songs, and the aforementioned two CDs of bonus content. Reviewing the reissue, Pitchfork critic Grayson Currin wrote that on Ladies and Gentlemen We Are Floating in Space, Pierce "unequivocally reached the height of his recorded powers." Spiritualized later performed the full album again at the All Tomorrow's Parties festival in May 2010, curated by Matt Groening.

In 2020, Rolling Stone ranked the album number 13 on their list of "Greatest Stoner Albums of All Time". The album was included in the book 1001 Albums You Must Hear Before You Die. In 2013, NME ranked it at number 156 in its list of the 500 Greatest Albums of All Time.

Track listing

Notes

Personnel
Spiritualized
Jason Pierce – vocals, guitars (Fender Telecaster, Fender Jaguar, Vox Starstream, Gibson Firebird), hammered dulcimer, piano, autoharp
Kate Radley – organs (Farfisa Compact, Vox Continental), piano, Roland D-20 synthesizer, backing vocals
Sean Cook – Fender Jazz bass guitar, harmonica
Damon Reece – drums, percussion, timbales, bells, timpani

Additional musicians

John Coxon – guitars (Fender Jaguar, Gibson Firebird), melodica, Roland JD-800 synthesizer
Ed Coxon – violin
B.J. Cole – pedal steel guitar
Angel Corpus Christi – accordion
Andy Davis – Hammond organ
Dr. John – piano and backing vocals on "Cop Shoot Cop..."
Simon Clarke – flute, baritone saxophone
Tim Sanders – tenor saxophone
Terry Edwards – tenor saxophone
Roddy Lorimer – trumpet, flugelhorn
Neil Sidwell – trombone
Tim Jones – French horn
The Balanescu Quartet (Alexander Balanescu, Clare Connors – violins; Kathy Burgess – viola; Sophie Harris – cello)
London Community Gospel Choir – choir

Technical

Jason Pierce – arrangement, horn arrangements, string arrangements, choral arrangements, production, mixing
John Coxon – production on "Stay with Me" and "The Individual"
Darren Allison – engineering, mixing
Chad Bamford – engineering, mixing
Mads Bjerke – engineering, editing, post-production
Trevor Curwen – engineering, mixing
John Leckie – engineering, mixing
Patrick McCarthy – engineering, mixing
Patrick McGovern – engineering, mixing
Carl Nappa – engineering
Darren Nash – engineering, assistant engineering, assistant mixing
Lem Lattimer – assistant engineering
Chris Scard – assistant engineering
Ray Staff – mastering
Simon Clarke – horn arrangements
Clare Connors – string arrangements
Ed Coxon – horn arrangements
Basil Hughes – choral arrangements
Tim Sanders – horn arrangements

Singles
"Supplementary Dosage" (June 1997; US promo-only CD)
"Cop Shoot Cop" (Live)
"Shine a Light" (Live)
"Electric Mainline" (Live)
"Cool Waves" (Instrumental)
"The X-Files Theme"

"Electricity" (28 July 1997)
CD1
"Electricity" (Edit)
"Take Your Time" (Live)
"All of My Tears" (Live)
"Cool Waves" (Instrumental)
CD2
"Electricity"
"Cop Shoot Cop" (Live)
"Shine a Light" (Live)
"Electric Mainline" (Live)

"I Think I'm in Love" (12 January 1998)
"I Think I'm in Love" (Edit)
"I Think I'm in Love" (The Chemical Brothers Remix)
"I Think I'm in Love" (The Chemical Brothers Instrumental)

"Come Together" (17 July 1998)
"Come Together" (Richard Fearless Remix)
"Come Together" (Two Lone Swordsmen Remix)

The Abbey Road EP (14 August 1998)
"Come Together" (Abbey Road Version)
"Broken Heart" (Abbey Road Version)
"Broken Heart" (Instrumental; Abbey Road Version)

Charts

References

External links
  An archive of music press reviews for Ladies and Gentlemen We Are Floating in Space at the official Darren Allison website.
 Soul Kitchen Magazine An extensive interview with Darren Allison about the recording of Ladies and Gentlemen We Are Floating in Space.

1997 albums
Spiritualized albums
Dedicated Records albums